Agaricus arvensis, commonly known as the horse mushroom, is a mushroom of the genus Agaricus.

Taxonomy
It was described as Agaricus arvensis by Jacob Christian Schaeffer in 1762, and given numerous binomial descriptions since. Its specific name arvensis means 'of the field'.

Description

The gills are pale pink to white at first, later passing through grey and brown to become dull chocolate. There is a large spreading ring, white above but sometimes with yellowish scales underneath. Viewed from below, on a closed-cap specimen, the twin-layered ring has a well-developed 'cogwheel' pattern around the stipe. This is the lower part of the double ring. The spores are brown and smooth. The odor is described as like anise. It belongs to a group of Agaricus which tend to stain yellow on bruising.

Similar species
When young, this fungus is often confused with species of the deadly genus Amanita.
Agaricus osecanus is rare, and is without the aniseed smell.
Agaricus xanthodermus, the yellow stainer, can cause stomach upsets.
Agaricus silvicola, the wood mushroom, is a touch more arboreal, with a frail and delicate ring, but also edible.
Agaricus campestris, the field mushroom, is generally (but not always) smaller, has pink gills when young, and is also edible.
Agaricus bitorquis, the spring agaricus, looks similar to arvensis and campestris, which are more common in the summer and autumn.
Agaricus bisporus is the most commonly cultivated mushroom of the genus Agaricus.

Distribution and habitat
It is one of the largest white Agaricus species in Britain (where it appears during the months of July–November), West Asia (Iran) and North America.
Frequently found near stables, as well as in meadows, it may form fairy rings. The mushroom is often found growing with nettles (a plant that also likes nutrient-rich soil).  It is sometimes found associated with spruce.

Conservation
This mushroom is considered common and widespread, and is not a conservation concern.

Edibility
This is a choice edible species which has been much prized by farmers for generations, being regarded as one of the most delicious of all edible fungi.  Despite this, the fruitbodies of this and other yellow-staining Agaricus species often have a build-up of heavy metals, such as cadmium and copper.

See also
List of Agaricus species

Gallery

References

External links
 Mushroom-collecting.com - Agaricus arvensis
 Mushroom Expert - Agaricus arvensis
 Mykoweb - Agaricus avernsis

arvensis
Edible fungi
Fungi of Europe
Fungi of North America
Fungi described in 1762
Taxa named by Jacob Christian Schäffer